Clay Smith (born 11 May 1993) is a former Australian rules footballer who played for the Western Bulldogs in the Australian Football League (AFL). Smith was drafted to the Western Bulldogs with the 17th selection in 2011 AFL Draft from the Gippsland Power in the TAC Cup.

Smith made his AFL debut on 1 April 2012 in the opening round of the 2012 AFL season against the West Coast Eagles. Smith was one of the Bulldogs' best players, gathering 13 possessions and kicking 4 goals, before being substituted off the field just before 3 quarter time due to severe cramping.

Clay Smith announced his retirement from AFL football on 9 July 2018 due to persistent injuries.

Statistics

|- style="background:#eaeaea;"
! scope="row" style="text-align:center" | 2012
|style="text-align:center;"|
| 14 || 16 || 6 || 5 || 135 || 85 || 220 || 55 || 75 || 0.4 || 0.3 || 8.4 || 5.3 || 13.8 || 3.4 || 4.7
|-
! scope="row" style="text-align:center" | 2013
|style="text-align:center;"|
| 14 || 14 || 10 || 6 || 128 || 84 || 212 || 38 || 61 || 0.7 || 0.4 || 9.1 || 6.0 || 15.1 || 2.7 || 4.4
|- style="background:#eaeaea;"
! scope="row" style="text-align:center" | 2014
|style="text-align:center;"|
| 14 || 1 || 0 || 1 || 8 || 5 || 13 || 1 || 2 || 0.0 || 1.0 || 8.0 || 5.0 || 13.0 || 1.0 || 2.0
|-
! scope="row" style="text-align:center" | 2015
|style="text-align:center;"|
| 14 || 3 || 1 || 0 || 13 || 15 || 28 || 5 || 10 || 0.3 || 0.0 || 4.3 || 5.0 || 9.3 || 1.7 || 3.3
|- style="background:#eaeaea;"
| scope=row bgcolor=F0E68C | 2016# 
|style="text-align:center;"|
| 14 || 13 || 18 || 11 || 100 || 94 || 194 || 43 || 77 || 1.4 || 0.8 || 7.7 || 7.2 || 14.9 || 3.3 || 5.9
|- style="background:#eaeaea;"
! scope="row" style="text-align:center" | 2017
|style="text-align:center;"|
| 14 || 8 || 8 || 5 || 52 || 40 || 92 || 24 || 41 || 1.0 || 0.6 || 6.5 || 5.0 || 11.5 || 3.0 || 5.1
|- class="sortbottom"
! colspan=3| Career
! 55
! 43
! 28
! 436
! 323
! 759
! 166
! 266
! 0.8
! 0.5
! 7.9
! 5.9
! 13.8
! 3.0
! 4.8
|}

Honours and achievements
Team
AFL premiership: 2016

References

External links

1993 births
Living people
Western Bulldogs players
Western Bulldogs Premiership players
Gippsland Power players
Williamstown Football Club players
Australian rules footballers from Victoria (Australia)
One-time VFL/AFL Premiership players